Paramonovo may refer to:
Paramonovo, Moscow Oblast, a village in Moscow Oblast, Russia
Paramonovo, Nizhny Novgorod Oblast, a village in Nizhny Novgorod Oblast, Russia
Paramonovo, name of several other rural localities in Russia